HD 143436 also known as HIP 78399, is a G-type star in the constellation Serpens. The temperature, rotation, mass, and abundance of elements in this star are close to properties of the Sun, and for this reason it is a solar twin candidate. The only notable difference is an approximately six times higher abundance of lithium compared to the Sun and most likely a younger age of 3.8 Gyr. The space velocity components of this star are (U, V, W) = (−19.2, −38.6, −7.0) km/s.

References 

G-type main-sequence stars
Solar twins
Serpens (constellation)
Durchmusterung objects
143436
078399